Amar is a 2019 Indian Kannada romantic action film directed by Nagashekar and produced by Sandesh Nagaraj under Sandesh Productions banner. The film stars Abhishek Gowda, son of veteran actor Ambareesh, making his acting debut and Tanya Hope in the lead roles. The supporting cast includes Devaraj, Sudharani, Chikkanna and Sadhu Kokila. Actor Darshan features in a guest role besides Anup Bhandari and Rachita Ram in special appearances.

The principal photography began on 28 May 2018 and the filming is set to be held in and around Bengaluru and Switzerland. The technical crew members for the film include Arjun Janya as the music composer, Satya Hegde as the cinematographer and Deepu S. Kumar as the editor.

Plot 
Amarnath (Abhishek), a happy-go-lucky youth, lives with his father (Deepak Shetty) and mother. Amar befriends Bobby then joins her and her team on the Saving Nature mission and eventually falls in love with her.

Bobby's father (Devaraj) decides to marry her to a businessman, Darshan's brother (Anup Bhandari). Amar breaks up with her, she leaves him heartbroken. After some years, he finds her and tries to convince her. In the climax, they reunite with the help of Darshan.

Cast 
 Abhishek Gowda as Amar
 Tanya Hope as Bobby
 Devaraj as Bobby's father
 Sudharani as Amar's mother
 Sadhu Kokila as Amar's uncle
 Chikkanna as Amar's friend
 Raj Deepak Shetty as Amar's father
 Arun Sagar as Devaraj's aide
 Darshan as Arun Subbiah in a special appearance
 Nirup Bhandari as Varun Subbiah in a special appearance in "Joru Paattu"
 Arjun Janya in a special appearance in "Joru Paattu"
 Rachita Ram in a guest appearance in the song "Joru Paattu"
 Baby Sameksha as Paapu

Production 
The film marked the acting debut of Abhishek, son of Ambareesh. The filming was held in Bengaluru and Switzerland.

Soundtrack
Arjun Janya is set to compose the score and soundtrack for the film. Reportedly, the title song of Abhishek's father Ambareesh starrer Olavina Udugore (1987) has been recreated in the film. The song "Marethuhoyithe" shot in Switzerland was a huge hit and was choreographed by B. Dhananjay.

Release 
The film was released in 300 theatres across Karnataka. The film received negative reviews from critics and audiences alike and performed average.

References

External links 
 
  Amar Movie (2019)

2010s Kannada-language films
Indian romantic action films
Films shot in Karnataka
Films scored by Arjun Janya
Films shot in Switzerland
2019 masala films
2010s romantic action films